Laguna de Tacarigua is a town in the state of Miranda, adjacent to the Laguna de Tacarigua National Park in Venezuela.

Populated places in Miranda (state)